Bibiano Zapirain (2 December 1919 – 2 December 2000) was a Uruguayan footballer.

Honours
Nacional
Primera División: 6
 1940, 1941, 1942, 1943, 1950, 1952

Uruguay
Copa América: 1
 1942

References

External links
Career summary by playerhistory.com

1919 births
2000 deaths
Uruguayan footballers
Uruguay international footballers
Uruguayan expatriate footballers
Expatriate footballers in Brazil
Uruguayan Primera División players
Club Nacional de Football players
Expatriate footballers in Italy
Serie A players
Inter Milan players
Categoría Primera A players
Cúcuta Deportivo footballers
Expatriate footballers in Colombia
Uruguayan expatriate sportspeople in Colombia
Copa América-winning players
Association football forwards